Meera Muralidharan (born 1990) is an Indian television actress and presenter.

Early and personal life
Meera was born in 1990 to P.N Muralidharan and Geetha in Cherthala, Alappuzha district. She married Manushankar in 2021.

Filmography

Films

Television

References

External links
 

Living people
Indian women television presenters
Actresses in Malayalam television
1990 births
Actresses in Malayalam cinema
Indian television presenters
Indian film actresses
Indian television actresses
21st-century Indian actresses